Teldenia strigosa is a moth in the family Drepanidae. It was described by Warren in 1903. It is found in New Guinea and on Goodenough Island.

References

Moths described in 1903
Drepaninae